The 213th Motor Rifle Division was a motorized infantry division of the Soviet Army. The division was based in Totskoye and existed from 1968 to 1991. In 1991, the division merged with the 27th Guards Motor Rifle Division.

History 

In April 1968, the division was activated in Totskoye, Orenburg Oblast, from the 29th Motor Rifle Division's 433rd Motor Rifle Regiment, left behind when the 29th transferred to the Far East.
 It was part of the Volga Military District. On 1 September 1980, the 1415th Antiaircraft Artillery Regiment transferred to the 108th Motor Rifle Division in Afghanistan and was replaced by the 108th's 1049th Antiaircraft Artillery Regiment. In September 1989, the Volga Military District was renamed the Volga–Urals Military District. On 1 June 1990, the 1049th Antiaircraft Artillery Regiment was disbanded and replaced by the 838th Antiaircraft Missile Regiment, transferred from the 28th Tank Division.

During the Cold War, the division was maintained at 20–25% strength. On 19 November 1990, according to CFE Treaty data, the division was equipped with 62 T-72 tanks, 139 BTR-70 and 25 BTR-60 armored personnel carriers, 36 BMP-1 and 15 BMP-1K infantry fighting vehicles, 12 2S1 Gvozdika and 36 2S3 Akatsiya self-propelled guns, and 12 BM-21 Grad multiple rocket launcher systems. On 17 April 1991, the division was merged with the 27th Guards Motor Rifle Division, which had arrived from Germany. The 680th and 691st Motor Rifle Regiments, the 34th Tank Regiment, and the 1283rd Artillery Regiment were merged with regiments of the 27th to create new units, which inherited the lineage of the 27th Division unit. The 433rd Motor Rifle Regiment was transferred to the 27th intact, replacing its disbanded 244th Guards Motor Rifle Regiment.

Composition 
In 1988, the division included the following units.
 433rd Motor Rifle Regiment 
 680th Motor Rifle Regiment 
 691st Motor Rifle Regiment 
 34th Tank Regiment 
 1283rd Artillery Regiment 
 1049th Antiaircraft Artillery Regiment 
 182nd Separate Rocket Battalion 
 1034th Separate Anti-Tank Artillery Battalion
 907th Separate Reconnaissance Battalion
 883rd Separate Engineer-Sapper Battalion 
 973rd Separate Communications Battalion 
 Separate Chemical Defense Company
 481st Separate Equipment Maintenance and Recovery Battalion 
 341st Separate Medical-Sanitary Battalion 
 893rd Separate Material Supply Battalion

References

Citations

Bibliography

Motor rifle divisions of the Soviet Union
Military units and formations established in 1968
Military units and formations disestablished in 1991